Nadirshah Mosque is a mosque situated in the city of Tiruchirappalli in the state of Tamil Nadu, India. It is situated in the western part of the city close to the Tiruchirappalli Fort Railway Station. It was built by rulers of the Carnatic Sultanate. The mosque is believed to contain the remains of the Nawab Muhammad Ali Khan Wallajah of the Carnatic and the headless body of the general Chanda Sahib who was beheaded by the Maratha king of the Thanjavur Maratha kingdom, Pratap Singh. The mosque gets its name from the tomb of the Muslim cleric Babayya Nadir Shah whose tomb lies within its precincts.

References 
 
 

Religious buildings and structures in Tiruchirappalli
Mosques in Tamil Nadu
Tiruchirappalli district